Willie D. Warren (born October 22, 1989) is an American professional basketball player for Al-Qurain SC of the Kuwait Basketball League. He played college basketball for  Oklahoma.

High school career
After a successful high school career at North Crowley High School, Warren was selected to be a McDonald's All-American. Considered a five-star recruit by Rivals.com, Warren was listed as the No. 4 point guard and the No. 10 player in the nation in 2008.

College career
Warren then went to the University of Oklahoma where he played on the same team as his eventual Clippers teammate, Blake Griffin. Despite being a projected lottery pick after a successful Freshman year, Warren stayed at OU, hoping to be the primary option with Griffin leaving for the draft. Throughout an injury-plagued Sophomore year he averaged over 16 points, 4 assists, 3 rebounds and just over 1 steal a game while shooting above 30% from 3-point range . At the end of his sophomore season, Warren decided to forgo his last two years of eligibility, signing with an agent and declaring for the 2010 NBA draft.

Professional career
Warren was drafted late in the 2nd round as the 54th overall by the Los Angeles Clippers on the day of the 2010 NBA draft. Then, on July 13, 2010, unlike many other late second-round picks, he was signed by the Clippers.

Late in the 2010–11 season, Warren was assigned to the NBA D-League. There, he played 6 games in 2011 for the Bakersfield Jam of the NBA D-League where he averaged 21.0 points, 7.0 assists, 5.3 rebounds and 1.0 steals per game while shooting above 50 percent from the field and 46 percent from 3-point range. The Jam went 5-1 with Warren in the lineup from February 4 – 16. After the D-League stint, Warren was called back into the Clippers' line-up, but he was later reassigned for a second stint on March 2, 2011. On December 19, 2011, Warren was waived by the Clippers.

In August 2012, Warren signed with Maccabi Rishon LeZion of the Israeli Super League for the 2012–13 season.

In the summer of 2013, he signed with Szolnoki Olaj KK of Hungary. On February 28, 2014, he was waived by Szolnoki. On March 4, 2014, he signed with Virtus Bologna of Italy for the rest of the 2013–14 Lega Basket Serie A season.

After playing for the Chongqing Fly Dragons during the 2014 NBL season, he signed with the club on September 18, 2014 for their inaugural season in the Chinese Basketball Association. On April 16, 2015, he signed with Club Sagesse of the Lebanese Basketball League. However, he never joined the Lebanese team due to an injury.

On August 6, 2015, Warren signed with Zhejiang Golden Bulls for the 2015–16 season. He later re-signed with Zhejiang for one more season.

On August 13, 2017, Warren signed with Petrochimi Bandar Imam of the Iranian Basketball Super League.

On December 9, 2017, Warren signed with the Shanxi Brave Dragons of the Chinese Basketball Association.

On February 22, 2018, Warren was acquired by the Texas Legends, but was waived on March 23 after playing three games.

On June 30, 2019 he has signed with Sporting Al Riyadi Beirut of the Lebanese Basketball League.

NBA career statistics

Regular season 

|-
| align="left" | 
| align="left" | L.A. Clippers
| 19 || 0 || 17.1 || .371 || .333 || .750 || .6 || 1.4 || .3 || .0 || 1.9
|-
| align="left" | Career
| align="left" | 
| 19 || 0 || 17.1 || .371 || .333 || .750 || .6 || 1.4 || .3 || .0 || 1.9

References

External links

Oklahoma Sooners bio
FIBA.com profile

1989 births
Living people
ABA League players
American expatriate basketball people in China
American expatriate basketball people in Hungary
American expatriate basketball people in Iran
American expatriate basketball people in Israel
American expatriate basketball people in Italy
American expatriate basketball people in Lebanon
American expatriate basketball people in Mexico
American expatriate basketball people in Saudi Arabia
American men's basketball players
Bakersfield Jam players
Basketball players from Dallas
Beijing Royal Fighters players
Los Angeles Clippers draft picks
Los Angeles Clippers players
Maccabi Rishon LeZion basketball players
McDonald's High School All-Americans
Mineros de Zacatecas (basketball) players
Oklahoma Sooners men's basketball players
Parade High School All-Americans (boys' basketball)
Petrochimi Bandar Imam BC players
Rio Grande Valley Vipers players
Shanxi Loongs players
Shooting guards
Szolnoki Olaj KK players
Texas Legends players
Virtus Bologna players
Zhejiang Golden Bulls players
Al Riyadi Club Beirut basketball players
American expatriate basketball people in Taiwan
Taoyuan Pilots players
P. League+ imports